Three regiments of the British Army have been numbered the 59th Regiment of Foot:

48th (Northamptonshire) Regiment of Foot, 59th Regiment of Foot, British infantry regiment numbered as the 59th Foot in 1747 and renumbered as the 48th in 1751.
57th (West Middlesex) Regiment of Foot, 59th Regiment of Foot,  British infantry regiment raised in 1755 and renumbered as the 57th in 1756
59th (2nd Nottinghamshire) Regiment of Foot, British infantry regiment raised as the 61st and renumbered as the 59th in 1756